33d Reconnaissance Squadron may refer to:
 The 422d Bombardment Squadron, designated the 33d Reconnaissance Squadron (Heavy) from March 1942 to April 1942.  
 The 33d Network Warfare Squadron, designated the 33d Reconnaissance Squadron (Night Photographic) from November 1947 to June 1949. 
 The 33d Reconnaissance Squadron (Fighter), active with this designation from April 1943 to August 1943.